Miridius quadrivirgatus, is a species of European bugs in the tribe Mirini. They can be found much of the western European mainland, Corsica, the Azores, southern England and Pembrokeshire.

Description

References

Insects described in 1853
Mirinae